Friends of Beer Party (abbreviated ) was a political party in the Czech Republic. Originally intended as a humorous commentary on the large number of new political parties, the party decided to run in the elections after receiving public attention. The party reached its peak in 1992 when it received 1.3%, but still failed to reach the threshold. In 1997 party cooperated with the Free Democrats – Liberal National Social Party (SD–LSNS). The party merged with the Czech Social Democratic Party (ČSSD) in 1998, and former members of the party created a Friends of Beer Club within ČSSD. The SPP now continues its activities as the Friends of Beer Association.

References

1990 establishments in Czechoslovakia
1998 disestablishments in Europe
Beer political parties
Political parties disestablished in 1998
Political parties established in 1990
Social democratic parties in the Czech Republic
Joke political parties in the Czech Republic
Consumer organizations in the Czech Republic
Czech Social Democratic Party